The 1930–31 season was Blackpool F.C.'s 30th season (27th consecutive) in the Football League. They competed in the 22-team Division One, then the top tier of English football, finishing twentieth and conceding a record 125 goals. Albert Watson's equalising goal against Manchester City in the final league game of the season was dubbed a "£10,000 goal", because it was said to be worth at least that amount as it secured the club's top-flight survival and its short-term future with the guarantee of large attendances for the next twelve months.

Jimmy Hampson was the club's top scorer for the fourth consecutive season, with 33 goals in total (32 in the league and one in the FA Cup).

Table

Notes

References

Blackpool F.C.
Blackpool F.C. seasons